is a Japanese footballer currently playing as a goalkeeper for Oita Trinita.

Career statistics

Club
.

Notes

References

External links

1996 births
Living people
Sportspeople from Saitama Prefecture
Association football people from Saitama Prefecture
Hosei University alumni
Japanese footballers
Association football goalkeepers
J1 League players
J2 League players
J3 League players
SC Sagamihara players
Thespakusatsu Gunma players
Oita Trinita players
Urawa Red Diamonds players